Jonathan Wilson (born October 19, 1957) is a Canadian actor, comedian and playwright, best known for his 1996 play My Own Private Oshawa. The play, a semi-autobiographical comedy about growing up gay in Oshawa, Ontario, was also optioned by Sandra Faire's SFA Productions for production as a film, which won an award at the Columbus International Film & Video Festival in 2002 before being broadcast as a television movie on CTV in 2005.

Career 
Wilson was a member of The Second City's Toronto cast in the early 1990s. He later collaborated with fellow Second City alumni Kathy Greenwood and Ed Sahely on the stage show Not to Be Repeated, in which the three performed a two-act improvisational narrative comedy play in each performance. The show was also later developed into a short-run television series, This Sitcom Is...Not to Be Repeated, for The Comedy Network in 2001. In 1998 he appeared on the LGBT-themed sketch comedy special In Thru the Out Door for CBC Television and Showtime.

Wilson's other acting credits include voice roles in Mia and Me, Little Bear, Harry and His Bucket Full of Dinosaurs, Totally Spies!, Skatoony, Camp Lakebottom, Yin Yang Yo!, Get Ed, BeyWheelz, Iggy Arbuckle, Miss Spider's Sunny Patch Friends, recurring roles in Traders, Freaky Stories, The Endless Grind, Sue Thomas: F.B.Eye and This Is Wonderland, film roles in House, Saint Ralph, New York Minute, PCU, Rubber Carpet and Brain Candy, commercials such as Rice Krispies, and stage productions of The Laramie Project, The Lion King, and The Normal Heart. He won a Dora Mavor Moore Award for Outstanding Performance in a Featured Role - Play or Musical for his performance as Timon in The Lion King.

In 2022, Wilson and Daniel Krolik starred in the Toronto Fringe Festival play Gay for Pay with Blake and Clay.

Filmography

Film

Television

References

External links

Living people
Canadian male film actors
Canadian male stage actors
Canadian male dramatists and playwrights
Canadian male musical theatre actors
Canadian male television actors
Canadian male voice actors
Canadian sketch comedians
Canadian television personalities
Comedians from Ontario
Dora Mavor Moore Award winners
Canadian gay actors
Canadian gay writers
Gay comedians
Canadian LGBT dramatists and playwrights
Male actors from Ontario
Male actors from Oshawa
20th-century Canadian dramatists and playwrights
21st-century Canadian dramatists and playwrights
20th-century Canadian male writers
21st-century Canadian male writers
1957 births
Canadian LGBT comedians
Gay dramatists and playwrights
21st-century Canadian LGBT people
20th-century Canadian LGBT people